Coulanges-la-Vineuse is a commune in the Yonne department in Bourgogne-Franche-Comté in north-central France. Best known for its wines, Coulanges produces extremely pleasing Red and Rosé wines, similar in style to those of nearby Irancy, although lacking something of the depth and structure. Most of the vines are Pinot Noir, although a few Gamay and Cesar vines remain. Unlike Irancy it is yet to win its own Village Appellation and the wines are labelled under the regional appellation Bourgogne Coulanges-la-Vineuse.

See also
Communes of the Yonne department

References

Communes of Yonne